Newville is an unincorporated community  in Braxton County, West Virginia, United States. The community has no public buildings aside from the Morrison Church, but it had a combined general store, post office, and gas station until the early 1980s. There is some small-scale mountain farming in the community, and many people have kitchen gardens.

References

Unincorporated communities in Braxton County, West Virginia
Unincorporated communities in West Virginia